Roadend Nunatak is a conspicuous nunatak 4 nautical miles (7 km) west-northwest of Bastion Hill along the north side of Darwin Glacier. So named by the Victoria University of Wellington Antarctic Expedition (VUWAE) (1962–63) because of its use as a landmark for manhauling sledge journeys and aircraft flights which supported the expedition and landed there.
 

Nunataks of Oates Land